Manuel Ezequiel Bruzual (Santa Marta, Colombia, 1830 – Curaçao, 15 August 1868), was a military leader committed to liberal ideas, also in charge of the War and Navy Ministry in 1864, and in 1868 was designated provisional president of Venezuela.

Biography
Bruzual participated actively in the Federal War, being known as the Courageous soldier of Federation, fought in Purereche, Santa Ines,  Buchivacoa, Barquisimeto and Portuguesa. Later, once the Federalist movement took government, President Juan Crisóstomo Falcón designated him as War and Navy minister (1864), resigning to the position after being imprisoned for the charges of conspiring.

In 1866, was named Head of the General Staff of the Army. On 6 April 1868, in Güigüe, had an interview with Miguel Antonio Rojas, Head of the Army of the Revolución Azul (Blue Revolution), and agreed the suspension of the hostilities by the lapse of 15 days, in order to discuss a treaty of peace, which was signed on 11 May. On 25 April 1868, was in charge of the Presidency of Venezuela. Later, on 19 June, had an interview with José Tadeo Monagas, leader of the Revolución Azul, but did not obtain an agreement, and the Government was overthrown.

Bruzual departed to Puerto Cabello, and thence is proclaimed in exercise of the presidency, he enlists troops, but was defeated by José Ruperto Monagas, on 14 August 1868.
Manuel Ezequiel Bruzual died in Curaçao, 15 August 1868 of wounds suffered in battle.

In 1872, his remains were repatriated by order of President Antonio Guzmán Blanco, being commissioned by his relative Blas Bruzual.

A municipality in Anzoátegui state was named after him, along with a town in Apure (Bruzual) and another in Portuguesa (Villa Bruzual).

References 
 Fundación Polar. "Bruzual, Manuel Ezequiel", Diccionario de Historia de Venezuela. Caracas: Fundacíon Polar, 1997. 

Presidents of Venezuela
Venezuelan soldiers
1830 births
1868 deaths
Great Liberal Party of Venezuela politicians
People from Santa Marta
Venezuelan people of Spanish descent